is a railway station on the Keio Inokashira Line in Suginami, Tokyo, Japan, operated by the private railway operator Keio Corporation.

Lines

Service pattern
Both all-stations "Local" services and limited-stop "Express" services stop at this station. During the daytime, there are eight "Local" and "eight "Express" services per hour in either direction.

Station layout
The station consists of two ground-level island platforms serving four tracks, and an above-track station building. It is the only station on the Inokashira Line which has passing loops, to allow transfers between express and local trains in both directions.

As of March 21, 2010, the old, underground station building was replaced by an above-station building, and a south exit was opened, in addition to the existing north exit. On March 23, 2011, the shopping center  was opened.

Before the station was rebuilt as an over-track station, there was a walkway at the end of the platforms toward Shibuya between the platforms and the station building, but it was connected by stairs only, with no barrier free facilities. However, the current station includes elevators and escalators between the concourse and platforms on the Kichijoji end of the platforms, and stairs on the Shibuya end, making it fully accessible.

In the concourse there is a bronze statue of a famous person from the area around the station and panel of photos from the time of the station's opening.

Platforms

The outer platforms, 1 and 4, are normally used by all-stations "Local" services.

History

The station opened on August 1, 1933.

From 22 February 2013, station numbering was introduced on Keio lines, with Eifukuchō Station becoming "IN09".

Passenger statistics
In fiscal 2011, the station was used by an average of 29,875 passengers daily.

The passenger figures for previous years are as shown below.

Surrounding area
 , after which the station was named

References

External links

 Eifukuchō Station information (Keio) 

Railway stations in Japan opened in 1933
Railway stations in Tokyo